Petit-Réderching (Lorraine Franconian: Kläänrederschinge) is a commune in the Moselle department of the Grand Est administrative region in north-eastern France. The village belongs to the Pays de Bitche. The similarly named commune Gros-Réderching lies 6 km to the west.

See also
 Communes of the Moselle department

References

External links
 

Petitrederching